Castle Towers Mountain is a triple summit mountain on the east side of Garibaldi Lake in southwestern British Columbia, Canada. The first ascent party from the BC Mountaineering Club named the mountain after its appearance in August 1911.

Climate

Based on the Köppen climate classification, the mountain is located in the marine west coast climate zone of western North America. Most weather fronts originate in the Pacific Ocean, and travel east toward the Coast Mountains where they are forced upward by the range (Orographic lift), causing them to drop their moisture in the form of rain or snowfall. As a result, the Coast Mountains experience high precipitation, especially during the winter months in the form of snowfall.

See also
 Phyllis's Engine

Gallery

References

Two-thousanders of British Columbia
Sea-to-Sky Corridor
Garibaldi Ranges
New Westminster Land District